Best of Steel Pole Bath Tub is a greatest hits compilation by Steel Pole Bath Tub, released in 1993 by Sento.

Track listing

Personnel 
Adapted from the Best of Steel Pole Bath Tub liner notes.

Steel Pole Bath Tub
 Dale Flattum – bass guitar, vocals
 Mike Morasky – guitar, vocals
 Darren Morey (as D.K. Mor-X) – drums, vocals

Production and additional personnel
Jonathan Burnside – engineering (1, 2, 4, 5, 7–9, 13, 14, 16)
Owen Connell – cover art, illustrations
Eric Holland – production and engineering (3, 6, 10–12, 15)
Masahiko Ohno – design, art direction
Steel Pole Bath Tub – production

Release history

References

External links 
 Best of Steel Pole Bath Tub at Discogs (list of releases)

1993 compilation albums
Steel Pole Bath Tub albums